Qarah Bolagh (also Romanized as Qarah Bolāgh and Qareh Bolāgh) is a village in Kuhsar Rural District, in the Central District of Hashtrud County, East Azerbaijan Province, Iran. At the 2006 census, its population was 280, in 78 families.

References 

Towns and villages in Hashtrud County